George Sinclair may refer to:
George Sinclair (footballer) (1884–1959), Scottish footballer
George Sinclair (mercenary) (1580–1612), Scottish mercenary who saw action in Sweden
George Sinclair (mathematician) (died 1696), Scottish mathematician
Sir George Sinclair (politician) (1912–2005), British Member of Parliament for Dorking
Sir George Sinclair, 2nd Baronet (1790–1868), British Member of Parliament for Caithness
George Robertson Sinclair (1863–1917), cathedral organist and inspiration of one of Elgar's Enigma Variations
George Sinclair (horticulturist) (1787–1834), gardener to the Duke of Bedford
George Sinclair, 4th Earl of Caithness (died 1582), Scottish nobleman
George Sinclair, 5th Earl of Caithness (died 1643), Scottish nobleman
George Sinclair, 6th Earl of Caithness (died 1676), Scottish nobleman
George Sinclair, 7th Earl of Caithness (died 1698), Scottish nobleman
George Sinclair, 15th Earl of Caithness (1858–1889), Scottish aristocrat
George Sinclair, the name of several Earls of Caithness
George Brian Sinclair (1928–2020), British general